The Manitoba Marlins Swim Club is a competitive swim club founded over 38 years ago based in Winnipeg, Manitoba, Canada. The Marlins are members of Swim Manitoba and Swimming Canada. They operate out of the Pan Am Pool, the aquatics site for the 1999 Pan American Games, the largest sporting event ever held in Canada, and the third largest ever in North America. Swimmers from the Manitoba Marlins have gone on to swim in national and international competitions, from competitions within the province to the Olympics. The Marlins host the annual Golden Plains Invitational attracting competitors from across the country.

Marlins Accomplishments 
 National Team Coach
 Swimmers named to National Team, Youth National Team, and Olympic Team

Medalists 
 Pan American Games
 Commonwealth Games
 National Championships
 National Youth Championships
 Pan Pacific Games
 Provincial Championships
 Canada Games

Records 
 Commonwealth
 Canadian
 Canadian Club
 Provincial Champions

External links
 Manitoba Marlins Swim Club
 Swim Manitoba
 Swimming Canada

Swim teams in Canada